Song of Back and Neck is a 2018 American comedy film written and directed by Paul Lieberstein in his directorial debut. The film stars Lieberstein, Rosemarie DeWitt, Robert Pine, Brian d'Arcy James, Clark Duke, Sam Anderson, Paul Feig, and Daniel Thrasher. The film was released on November 30, 2018, by The Orchard.

Cast  
Paul Lieberstein as Fred Trolleycar
Rosemarie DeWitt as Regan Stearns
Robert Pine as David Trolleycar 
Brian d'Arcy James as Stone 
Clark Duke as Atkins
Sam Anderson as Jarred Foxen 
Paul Feig as Dr. Street 
Ike Barinholtz as Nurse
Raymond Ma as Dr. Kuhang
Alice Wen as Sia
Rajeev Chhibber as Charles
Chelsea Cook as Jenny
Treisa Gary as Beverly
Alexis Hamer as Alexis
Scott Hutchison as Scott
Elizabeth Jardine as Ally
Edwin Kho as Gon-Xi
Nora Kirkpatrick as Nora
Kaidy Kuna as Restaurant Manager
Paul Kwo as Zhang Wei
Ryan Lee as Ryan
Jessica McKenna as Dawn	
Janine Poreba as Tracey
Jennifer Prediger as Jennifer
Trinka Soloway as Maurney
Luke Spencer Roberts as Pete
Daniel Thrasher as Alex
William Wang as Dr. Huang's Teacher
Coca Xie as Coca

Release
The film premiered at the Tribeca Film Festival on April 23, 2018. On July 13, 2018, The Orchard acquired distribution rights to the film. The film was released on November 30, 2018, by The Orchard.

References

External links
 

2018 films
2018 comedy films
American comedy films
2010s English-language films
2010s American films